The 1941 USC Trojans football team was an American football team that represented the University of Southern California as a member of the Pacific Coast Conference during the 1941 college football season. The team was led by first-year head coach Sam Barry who took over after Howard Jones died during the previous off-season.  Barry also coached USC's basketball and baseball teams.  The Trojans compiled a 2–6–1 record (2–4–1 against PCC opponents) and finished eighth out of ten in the conference.

Schedule

References

USC
USC Trojans football seasons
USC Trojans football